The  ("War of Sticks") of 1802 resulted in the collapse of the Helvetic Republic, the renewed French occupation of Switzerland and ultimately the Act of Mediation dictated by Napoleon on 19 February 1803. The conflict itself was between insurgents, mostly drawn from the rural population, and the official forces of the  Helvetic Republic. The term Stäckli, or "wooden club," from which the conflict draws its name, refers to the improvised weaponry of the insurgents.

The Swiss war 
Following the Treaty of Lunéville, the French troops left Switzerland during the summer of 1802, resulting in rapid destabilization of the country. This instability reached a head with the open rebellion which originated in Central Switzerland and was centered around the cities of Zürich and Bern, as well as rural parts of the Swiss plateau in the cantons Aargau and Solothurn. The war began with an engagement at Rengg pass in Pilatus on 28 August, followed by artillery attacks on Bern and Zürich during September, and a skirmish at Faoug on 3 October. After several hostile clashes with the under-equipped and less motivated forces of the Helvetic Republic, the central government capitulated militarily on 18 September, retreating from Bern to Lausanne, and then collapsed entirely. It was succeeded by cantonal governments, and a Tagsatzung in Schwyz led by Alois von Reding.

With the more liberal order of the Helvetic Republic, anti-Jewish sentiment rose, as accusations emerged that Jews were unfairly profiting from the unpopular new order. On the 21st of September 1802, the hatred and resentment came to a head in the so-called “Zwetschgenkrieg” or plum war. In an outbreak of violence, spurred on by antisemitic rumours, an armed horde of 800 farmers, craftsmen and some patricians assaulted the Surbtal Jews, looting and destroying their homes and belongings. The attack was not entirely unexpected, tensions having built up over several days, and the Christian inhabitants of Endingen and Lengnau were largely unaffected. The Jews did not receive compensation for the damages, and the perpetrators did not face any consequences.

Napoleon was concerned that the instability of Switzerland could infect Europe at large, and was authorized to negotiate a settlement between the feuding sides. His Act of Mediation made concessions to the demands of the insurgents, abandoning the centralist structure of the Helvetic Republic in favor of a more federalist approach. He likewise stated the natural state of Switzerland was federal and that attempts to force any other system upon them were unwise.

The British response 
French intervention constituted a breach of the Treaty of Amiens, which was used as a pretext by the United Kingdom to resume their war against France on 18 May 1803. The French involvement within the internal affairs of the Swiss was exemplary of Britain's worry that it was to have a diminishing role in continental affairs. Though the British often attempted to stay removed from the internal struggles of the Continent, the actions of Napoleon's France threatened to upset the existing order and thus Britain's existing economic supremacy.  While the Acts of Mediation enforced by French intervention did not particularly upset the Swiss order, in fact restoring much of pre-existing traditions and forms of Swiss government from before the French Republican invasion, it was a technical violation of the Treaty of Amiens, which prohibited such foreign meddling by France.

In regards to civil response to the actions of the French, William Wordsworth's poem Thought of a Briton on the Subjugation of Switzerland was directly inspired by the events of the Stecklikrieg.  His poetry of the period was his response to the "easy jingoism" which he considered to often captivate the British populace.  In the Subjugation of Switzerland, he relates his experiences on the differences between the "place" of a nation and the "politics" of one.  He saw the French intervention in Switzerland as a repudiation of the philosophy of the Revolution and supported the British declaration of the continuation of the war against France, though he did still sympathize with the values initially claimed by the French Revolution.

References

External links

Abschnitt in der Geschichte des Kantons Bern seit 1798

Wars involving Switzerland
Conflicts in 1802
1802 in Europe
Campaigns of the Napoleonic Wars
1802 in Switzerland
August 1802 events
September 1802 events
October 1802 events
Helvetic Republic
Civil wars in Switzerland